The Iverni were a people of early Ireland first mentioned in Ptolemy's 2nd century Geography as living in the extreme south-west of the island. He also locates a "city" called Ivernis in their territory, and observes that this settlement has the same name as the island as a whole, Ivernia. It was probably once the name given to all the peoples of Ireland, but by Ptolemy's time had a more restricted usage applicable to the inhabitants of the south-west. These Iverni can be identified linguistically with the Érainn (Éraind, Érnai, Érna), a people attested in Munster and elsewhere in the early Middle Ages.

The prehistoric Érainn royal dynasties are sometimes referred to as the Dáirine.

Etymology
The name Iverni has been derived from Archaic Irish *Īwernī meaning "folk of *Īweriū " (the island of Ireland). This is in turn derived from Proto-Celtic  *Φīwerjon- and further from Proto-Indo-European *piHwerjon- (the fertile land), which is cognate with the Ancient Greek píeira and Sanskrit pīvarī, which refer to fertile land. John T. Koch writes it was probably once the name given to all the peoples of Ireland, but by Ptolemy's time had a more restricted usage applicable to the inhabitants of the south-west.

Historical septs
In early Irish genealogical tracts the Érainn are regarded as an ethnic group, distinct from the Laigin and Cruthin. Population groups in Munster classed as Érainn include the Corcu Loígde in southwest County Cork, the Múscraige in Counties Cork and Tipperary, the Corcu Duibne in County Kerry, and the Corcu Baiscinn in west County Clare. The Dál Riata and Dál Fiatach (or Ulaid) in Ulster are also considered Érainn. The Érainn appear to have been a powerful group in the proto-historic period, but in early historical times were largely reduced to politically marginal status, with the notable exception of the enigmatic Osraige. The most important of the Munster Érainn, the Corcu Loígde, retained some measure of prestige even after they had become marginalised by the Eóganachta in the 7th or 8th century. It is likely that the sometimes powerful Uí Liatháin and their close kin the Uí Fidgenti originally belonged to the Érainn/Dáirine as well, but were later counted among the Eóganachta for political reasons. Another prominent Érainn people of early Munster are believed to have been the Mairtine, who by the early historical period have completely vanished from the Irish landscape, although they may be in part ancestral to the later Déisi Tuisceart and Dál gCais. The Déisi Muman may also have had Érainn origins, but this has long been disputed.

Dáire: Darini, Dáirine
It seems likely the Iverni were related to the Darini of eastern Ulster. The name "Darini" implies descent from an ancestor called Dáire, (*Dārios) as claimed by several historical peoples identified as Érainn, including the Dál Riata and Dál Fiatach in eastern Ulster as well as the Érainn of Munster. An early name for Dundrum, County Down, is recorded as Dún Droma Dáirine, and the name Dáirine was applied to the Corcu Loígde, further suggesting a relationship between the Darini and the Iverni.

Érainn: Clanna Dedad
The genealogies trace the descent of the Érainn from two separate eponymous ancestors, Ailill Érann and Íar mac Dedad. Legendary relatives of the latter include the Cland Dedad (offspring of Deda mac Sin), a Munster people who appear in the Ulster Cycle, led by Cú Roí, son of Dáire mac Dedad, and the legendary High King Conaire Mór, grandson of Iar and ancestor of the Síl Conairi. The historical sept of the Uí Maicc Iair ("grandsons of the son of Iar") and the MAQI IARI of ogham inscriptions also appear to be related. The personal name Iar is simply another variant of the root present in Iverni and Érainn. Finally, the name Íth, given in the genealogies as the ultimate ancestor of the Corcu Loígde (Dáirine) and offering some confusion about their parentage and relation to the Iverni, in fact preserves the same Indo-European root *peiH- ("to be fat, swell"), thus in effect completing a basic picture of the Iverni/Érainn and their kindred in later historical Ireland.

O'Rahilly's theory
Ivernic is a hypothetical language proposed by T. F. O'Rahilly. He suggested that it was an unattested P-Celtic (probably Brittonic) language spoken in Ireland before Old Irish. He suggested this language was spoken by the Iverni, and that they invaded Ireland from Britain, bringing with them the language. O'Rahilly identifies two words recorded in the Sanas Cormaic as coming from Ivernic: ond ("stone") and fern ("anything good").

His theory has been refuted and is not widely accepted by experts. Furthermore, by the proto-historic period, the Iverni were evidently Goidelic-speaking, as ogham inscriptions in Archaic Irish are most plentiful in southwestern Ireland, the territory of the Iverni.

See also
List of Irish kingdoms
List of Celtic tribes
Mac Con

References

Bibliography

J.-J. Tierney, The Greek geographic tradition and Ptolemy's evidence for Irish geography, in RIA Proc., Ixxxvi (1976) sect.C, pp. 257–265
Theodore William Moody, A New History of Ireland, p. 140, Oxford University Press, 1976
Nora Kershaw Chadwick, The Celts, Pelican Books, 1970
C. Thomas Cairney, Clans and Families of Ireland and Scotland, An Ethnography of the Gael, AD 500 – 1750, McFarland & Company Inc, Publishers 
T. F. O'Rahilly, Irish Dialects, Past and Present, 1932
 T. F. O'Rahilly, The Goidals and Their Predecessors, London, The British Academy, 1935
 C. F. C. Hawkes, Pytheas: Europe and the Greek Explorers, Oxford University Press, 1977
  John Haywood, Atlas historique des Celtes, trad. Colette Stévanovitch, éditions Autrement, coll. Atlas/Mémoires, Paris, 2002, .

  Byrne, Francis John, Irish Kings and High-Kings. Batsford, London, 1973 
  Duffy, Seán (ed.), Atlas of Irish History. Gill & Macmillan, Dublin, 2nd edn, 2000 
 Nora Chadwick, The Celts, Pelican Books, 1971
 C. Thomas. Cairney, Clans and Families of Ireland and Scotland – An Ethnography of the Gael AD 500–1750, Willow Bend Books, 1989.
 Richard Bradley The Prehistory of Britain and Ireland, Cambridge University Press, 2007, 
 T. M. Charles-Edwards, Early Christian Ireland, Cambridge University Press, 2000, 
 Barry Raftery, Pagan Celtic Ireland: The Enigma of the Irish Iron Age, Thames and Hudson, 1998 
 Lloyd Robert Laing, The Archaeology of Celtic Britain and Ireland, C. AD 400–1200: C. AD 400 – 1200, Cambridge University Press, 2006 

 
Prehistoric Ireland
Gaelic-Irish nations and dynasties
Tribes of ancient Ireland
History of County Cork
Medieval Ireland